Aggrey Memorial A.M.E. Zion Senior High School is a publicly-supported Coeducational senior high school in Cape Coast, Ghana. It educates students to pass the WASSCE.

Academics
The academic performance of students has always been high compared to that of sister schools. The Ordinary and Advanced Level ('O' and 'A' Level) programmes were respectively phased out in 1994 and 1996 when the government of Ghana introduced the new "Educational Reform Programme" started in 1999. The school currently offers four of five programs that the new system addresses:
Agricultural Science,
Business,
Vocational (Home Economics and Visual Arts), and
General (Arts and Science).
The only programme that the school does not offer is Technical Programme. In 2001, Out of the total number of 500 candidates the school presented for the West African Senior High School Certificate Examination (WASSCE), 498 passed in five or more subjects out of 499 students who took the examination. The highest-performing student scored 7 A1s and a B2 while three others obtained 7 A1s and a B3.

The school also participates in the Robotics Inspired Science Education (RiSE) Workshop mission that inspires and energizes teachers, middle school, high school and college students in Ghana to pursue education and careers in science, technology, engineering, and mathematics (STEM) by using the motivational effects of robots to connect theory with practice.

Excellence
In 1997, the Senior Secondary Certificate Examinations conducted by the West Africa Examinations Council, Aggrey Memorial Zion Secondary School was one of the schools honoured by the Council for academic excellence. The school produced the best Agricultural Science Student in this examination.

The school's Information and Communication Technology (ICT) status is very high with a 120 feet transmission mast linked via satellite with AT&T in the US.

The Aggrey Memorial A.M.E. Zion Senior High School undertook a project designed to assemble and fly light aeroplanes in the country in 2010. The project, the first of its kind by an educational institution in Ghana, was in collaboration with the Franklyn College in the United Kingdom and the British Model Flying Association (BMFA).

Notable alumni 

 Kofi Acquah-Dadzie, academic and judge
 Kojo Asemanyi, politician 
 T. D. Brodie-Mends, politician
 Mustapha Essuman, footballer
 Ken Kanda, Ghanaian representative to the United Nations
 Rose Mensah-Kutin, gender advocate, journalist
 Abrewa Nana, musician
 Yvonne Nelson, actress
 George Brigars Williams, actor
 John Kudalor, former Inspector General of Police

References

External links
 

Educational institutions established in 1940
High schools in Ghana
Cape Coast
Boarding schools in Ghana
1940 establishments in Gold Coast (British colony)